Turkiella is a genus of mite in the family Laelapidae.

Species
 Turkiella theseus (Zumpt)

References

Laelapidae